Arhopala similis is a species of butterfly belonging to the lycaenid family described by Hamilton Herbert Druce in 1895. It is found in Southeast Asia (Peninsular Malaya, Sumatra, Borneo, Lingga).

References

External links

Arhopala
Butterflies described in 1895
Taxa named by Hamilton Herbert Druce
Butterflies of Asia